The Luț is a right tributary of the river Mureș in Transylvania, Romania. It discharges into the Mureș near Glodeni. It passes through the villages Monor, Batoș, Goreni, Breaza and Voivodeni. Its main tributaries are, from source to mouth:
Căpâlna (left)
Uila (right)
Săcalul (left)
Fleț (right)
Agriș (right)

References

Rivers of Romania
Rivers of Mureș County
Rivers of Bistrița-Năsăud County